John Willox may refer to:

John Willock (c.1515–1585), or John Willox, Scottish reformer
John A. Willox (1842–1905), British journalist, newspaper owner and politician